Neuhuyskade is a street along a canal in The Hague, Netherlands. It connects between the Wassenaarseweg at its north end to Benoordenhout at its south end.

Streets in The Hague